Shireen Akhter (born 1 May 1956) is a Bangladeshi academic. She is the current and the first female vice chancellor  of the University of Chittagong.

Background and education
Akhter was born at joarianala, Ramu in Cox's Bazar on 1 May 1956. Her father was Afsar Kamal Chowdhury and mother was Begum Lutfunnahar Kamal. Her husband is Latiful Alam Chowdhury. She is mother of one son and one daughter.

Akhter completed her SSC and HSC in 1973 and 1975 respectively. She earned her bachelor's and master's from the University of Chittagong  in 1978 and 1981 respectively.  In 1991, She earned her  PhD from Jadavpur University, Kolkata, India.

Professional career
Akhter  was a member of Election Commission (EC) Search committee. She joined the University of Chittagong as a lecturer of Bangla department in 1996.

Works
 Bangladesher Tinjon  Oupanyasik  Showkat :  Osman, Waliullah, Abu Ishaq. (1991)

References 

1956 births
Living people
People from Cox's Bazar District
University of Chittagong alumni
Academic staff of the University of Chittagong
Bangladeshi women academics
Jadavpur University alumni
Vice-Chancellors of the University of Chittagong
Recipients of Begum Rokeya Padak